Jong Pok-sim (born 31 July 1985) is a North Korean footballer who played as a defender for the North Korea women's national football team. She was part of the team at the 2007 FIFA Women's World Cup and 2011 FIFA Women's World Cup. At the club level, she plays for 25 April in North Korea.

International goals

References

External links
 

1985 births
Living people
North Korean women's footballers
North Korea women's international footballers
Place of birth missing (living people)
2011 FIFA Women's World Cup players
Women's association football defenders
2007 FIFA Women's World Cup players
Asian Games gold medalists for North Korea
Asian Games silver medalists for North Korea
Asian Games medalists in football
Footballers at the 2006 Asian Games
Footballers at the 2010 Asian Games
Medalists at the 2006 Asian Games
Medalists at the 2010 Asian Games
21st-century North Korean women